A Haunting in Cawdor is a 2015 American horror thriller film written and directed by Phil Wurtzel and starring Cary Elwes.

Cast
Cary Elwes as Lawrence O'Neil
Shelby Young as Vivian Miller
Michael Welch as Roddy
Allie DeBerry as Jeanette Welles
Charlie King as Charles Kosack
Bethany Edlund as Tina
Julie Grisham as Mackenzie
Samantha Rickard as Lisa
Anna Bradley as Terri Welles
Philip David Black as Brian
Patrick Hunter as Lance
Jamey Grisham as Michael Cross
Michael Rolando as Gary Baines
Jordan Moody as Neil Stams
Penelope Alex Ragotzy as Tess
Patrick Floch as Dr. Peter Lazarus
Scott T. Whitesell as Frank Seals
Bob Stuart as P.O. Mullen

Reception
The film has a 14% approval rating on Rotten Tomatoes, based on seven reviews with an average score of 2.5/10.

References

External links
 
 

2015 horror thriller films
American horror thriller films
2010s English-language films
2010s American films